Adelphagrotis stellaris is a moth of the family Noctuidae. It is found along the West Coast from southern British Columbia east to the Cascades in the north and southward to the central California Coast Range.

The wingspan is about 36 mm. Adults are on wing from July to August.

The larvae feed on a wide range of flowering trees and shrubs, including Vaccinium, Symphoricarpos, Rubus spectabilis and Oemleria cerasiformis.

External links
Bug Guide

Noctuinae
Moths of North America
Moths described in 1880